Wang Qiang was the defending champion but chose not to defend her title.

Ekaterina Alexandrova won the title, defeating Aryna Sabalenka in the final, 6–2, 7–5.

Seeds

Draw

Finals

Top half

Bottom half

References
Main Draw

Pingshan Open - Singles
Pingshan Open